Lionel Avard Forsyth (1 August 1890 – 1 January 1957) was a Canadian businessperson. He served as President of the Dominion Steel and Coal Corporation beginning in 1950.

Forsyth graduated from University of King's College and Harvard University. He then was employed by the Bank of Nova Scotia in 1913. He became a professor at King's College and later passed the Nova Scotia bar.

References

External links
 The Sun Rises in the East, an address to The Empire Club of Canada by Lionel Avard Forsyth, President of the Dominion Steel and Coal Corporation Ltd. on October 22, 1953.
  Google Books, Here Be Dragons: Telling Tales Of People, Passion and Power By Peter C. Newman 

1890 births
1957 deaths
People from Hants County, Nova Scotia
University of King's College alumni
Academic staff of University of King's College
Lawyers in Nova Scotia
Businesspeople from Nova Scotia
Harvard University alumni